Richard A. Robinson (born December 10, 1957) is an American lawyer and judge, who has served as chief justice of the Connecticut Supreme Court since 2018, and previously as an associate justice from 2013 to 2018.

Born in Stamford, Connecticut, Robinson received a Bachelor of Arts from the University of Connecticut in 1979 and a Juris Doctor from the West Virginia University College of Law in 1984. He was Staff Counsel for the City of Stamford Law Department from 1985 to 1988, when he became Assistant Corporation Counsel in Stamford.

In 2000, Robinson was appointed to the Connecticut Superior Court, serving until his appointment to the Connecticut Appellate Court on December 10, 2007. He was appointed to the Connecticut Supreme Court on December 19, 2013.

In November 2017, the Chief Justice of Connecticut Chase T. Rogers announced that she would retire in February 2018. Governor Dannel Malloy nominated associate justice Andrew J. McDonald to be the next chief justice, but his nomination was rejected by the Connecticut Senate. In April 2018, Governor Malloy nominated Robinson to be chief justice of Connecticut. Robinson was sworn in as chief justice on June 18, 2018. He is the first African-American chief justice in Connecticut's history.

See also
List of African-American jurists

References

|-

1957 births
Living people
20th-century American lawyers
21st-century American judges
African-American judges
African-American lawyers
Chief Justices of the Connecticut Supreme Court
Connecticut lawyers
Justices of the Connecticut Supreme Court
Politicians from Stamford, Connecticut
University of Connecticut alumni
West Virginia University College of Law alumni
20th-century African-American people
21st-century African-American people